Papillion is a city in and the county seat of Sarpy County, Nebraska. The city developed in the 1870s as a railroad town and suburb of Omaha. The city is part of the larger five-county metro area of Omaha. Papillion's population was 24,159 at the 2020 census. Its growth since the late 20th century has reflected Omaha's.

Overview
The city was named after the creek of the same name which flows through its center; this had been named by early French explorers, as France had claimed this territory through the eighteenth century. The name Papillion is derived from the French term (papillon) for butterfly. According to local tradition, the early French explorers named the creek as Papillon because they saw so many butterflies along its grassy banks. The spelling was changed through a transliteration of the French word.

Papillion was platted in 1870 when the railroad was extended to that point. Papillion (sometimes referred to as "Papio" by its residents) is one of the last of the late 18th-century, Paris-inspired frontier cities left in the Midwestern United States.

Halleck Park, a recreation area in the heart of the city, includes many trails, open spaces, trees and a number of areas of interest, including Papio Fun Park, Papio Bay Aquatic Park, Papio Pool, and Papio Bowl. The park also offers tennis courts, volleyball courts, playgrounds, "The Duck Pond", Monarch Field ("The Pit"), and E.A. Fricke Field.

It also has nine other softball diamonds within the park for youth.  The diamonds are sited on three fields: Halleck, Blonde, and Papio Bay.  Village Park, Papio Bay Aquatic Center (including two water slides and a zero depth pool) and Walnut Creek recreational park are among the other recreational amenities in the city.

Papillion Middle School is in the downtown area south of Papio Creek; the building formerly was used as the high school until August 1971. The former junior high was located directly west, across the street.

Also downtown are the Old A.W. Clarke banking house, Sump Memorial Library, Portal One-Room School House, Papillion Municipal Building (Sarpy County Courthouse until 1970), and the John Sautter House. Other areas of interest in Papillion include the Sarpy County Court House and Jail, Shadow Lake Towne Center, and Midlands Hospital, all along Nebraska Highway 370 in the southern portion of the city.

Papillion has a Triple-A Minor League Baseball team. The Storm Chasers were formerly the Omaha Royals; after 42 years at Rosenblatt Stadium in south Omaha, the team moved out following the 2010 season and changed their nickname. They have been the only Triple-A affiliate of the Kansas City Royals, an expansion club that entered the American League in 1969. In conjunction with Major League Baseball's restructuring of Minor League Baseball in 2021, the Storm Chasers were placed into the new Triple-A East.

Politics

Papillion is divided into four wards, with two councilmembers elected from each. One seat for each ward is up for election every two years, with each term lasting four years.  The mayor is the head of the city council and is elected at-large to four-year terms. The council meets every two weeks. Following former Mayor James Blinn's resignation on July 7, 2009, city council president David Black succeeded to become mayor of Papillion. He was elected in 2010 for his first full term; as of October 2022, he had been mayor for 13 years, running unopposed in the 2022 election cycle.

Geography

Demographics

2010 census
As of the 2010 census,  there were 18,894 people, 6,925 households, and 5,079 families living in the city. The racial makeup of the city was 90.7% White, 3.3% African American, 0.4% Native American, 1.5% Asian, 1.5% from other races, and 2.7% from two or more races. Hispanic or Latino people of any race were 5.2% of the population.

There were 6,925 households, of which 38.1% had children under the age of 18 living with them, 59.5% were married couples living together, 10.1% had a female householder with no husband present, 3.7% had a male householder with no wife present, and 26.7% were non-families. 22.5% of all households were made up of individuals, and 9% had someone living alone who was 65 years of age or older. The average household size was 2.68 and the average family size was 3.15.

The median age in the city was 36.8 years. 27.3% of residents were under the age of 18; 9.1% were between the ages of 18 and 24; 24.3% were from 25 to 44; 28.5% were from 45 to 64; and 11% were 65 years of age or older. The gender makeup of the city was 48.8% male and 51.2% female.

Schools
Papillion is part of the Papillion-La Vista Public School District, which includes two high schools, three middle schools and fifteen public elementary schools. Papillion-La Vista South High School, the newer of the two high schools, opened in 2003. It is located in southwest Papillion while Papillion-La Vista High School, opened in 1971, is located in the northern part of the city close to the LaVista border. The school district has well over 8,000 students and is one of the fastest-growing districts in Nebraska. 

Papillion is home to Nebraska Christian College, accredited by the Association for Biblical Higher Education.

Climate

Notable people
Abbie Cobb, actress and author
Brandon Curran, soccer defender
Merle Curti, historian
Cade Johnson, football wide receiver
Alonzo Martinez, mixed martial artist
Chris Petersen, guitarist
Amber Rolfzen, volleyball player
Becca Swanson, powerlifter and wrestler
Allison Weston, volleyball player

References

External links

 papillion.org - City of Papillion website

1870 establishments in Nebraska
Cities in Nebraska
Cities in Sarpy County, Nebraska
County seats in Nebraska
French-American history of Nebraska
History of Omaha, Nebraska by community area
Populated places established in 1870